Augustinian may refer to:

Augustinians, members of religious orders following the Rule of St Augustine
Augustinianism, the teachings of Augustine of Hippo and his intellectual heirs
Someone who follows Augustine of Hippo
Canons Regular of Saint Augustine also called "Augustinian Canons" or "Austin Canons"
Order of Saint Augustine, a mendicant order, also called "Augustinian Friars" or "Austin Friars"

See also
Augustine (disambiguation)

Augustine of Hippo